Progue House is a historic home located at Rhinebeck, Dutchess County, New York.  It was built about 1763, and is a 2-story, stone building built into a hillside. It has a -story saltbox-style side wing.  It is an example of a vernacular German stone farmhouse of the 18th century.  Also on the property are a contributing barn, four sheds, and a privy. It was added to the National Register of Historic Places in 1987.

References

Houses on the National Register of Historic Places in New York (state)
Houses completed in 1763
Houses in Rhinebeck, New York
National Register of Historic Places in Dutchess County, New York